Starobazanovo (İśke Baźan) is a rural locality (a selo) and the administrative centre of Starobazanovsky Selsoviet, Birsky District, Bashkortostan, Russia. The population was 11 as of 2010. There are 3 streets.

Geography 
Starobazanovo is located 24 km southwest of Birsk (the district's administrative centre) by road. Srednebazanovo is the nearest rural locality.

References 

Rural localities in Birsky District